In the Society of Jesus, an Admonitor is an advisor to the Superior General whose responsibility it is to warn (or admonish) the General honestly and confidentially about "what in him he thinks would be for the greater service and glory of God" [Const. N°770]. That means in any matter, whether in regard to his own person (health, spiritual life, etc.) or to his governance (exercise of authority, personal obedience, etc.)

The Admonitor of the Superior General is appointed (elected) by the same General Congregation that elects the Superior General, as an expression of the "provident care which the Society exercises in regard to the Superior General" [Const. N°766]. He should be a man "familiar with God, of sound and mature judgment, well versed in the matters of the Society of Jesus, discreet and prudent, not credulous or timid" [Norms, N°379]. A Regional Assistant is usually given this extra office.

In the Society of Jesus, besides the Superior General, all those who have authority - Provincials, Rectors and Superiors - are given an 'Admonitor' (appointed by the immediate higher superior) who mutatis mutandis has a similar responsibility.

List of Admonitors 

 Giovanni Stefano Menochio (1575–1655), admonitor to the Superiors General Vincenzo Caraffa and Francisco Piccolomini
 James E. Grummer, admonitor to Superior General Adolfo Nicolás

References

Society of Jesus